The 2020 Latvian Football Cup is the 26th edition of the football tournament. The competition began on 23 July. RFS were the defending champions, having won the previous year's final over Jelgava 3–2 after extra time. The cup winners qualified for the 2021–22 UEFA Europa League 1st qualifying round.

Format 
47 teams took part in the competition. Each round was played over single leg and matches took place for 90 minutes, with two halves of 45 minutes. If tied after regular time, 30 minutes of extra time were played, consisting of two periods of 15 minutes. If the score was still level after this, the match was decided by a penalty shoot-out in order to decide the winner. No seeding was applied at any round.

Participating teams

First round 
The draw for the first round was held on 7 July. Teams from 2. līga and 3. līga only entered the competition at this point. Two teams: FK Valka and FK Alberts got byes to the second round. The matches were played between 23 July and 9 August 2020.

Second round 
13 winners of the first round were joined by FK Valka and FK Alberts (both teams had byes to the second round) as well as nine teams from the 1. līga. The matches are planned to be played over the weekend of 21–23 August 2020.

Third round 
12 winners of the second round took part in the third round. The matches are planned to be played over the weekend of 4–6 September 2020.

Fourth round 
6 winners of the third round are joined by 10 teams of Latvian Virslīga.

Quarter-finals 
8 winners of the fourth round take part in the quarter-finals.

Semi-finals 
4 winners of the quarter-finals take part in the semi-finals.

Final 
The final was played on 8 November 2020.

See also 
 2020 Latvian Higher League
 2020 Latvian First League

References

External links 
 LFF.lv
 uefa.com

Latvian Football Cup seasons
Latvian Football Cup
2020 in Latvian football